A descarga is an improvised jam session consisting of variations on Cuban music themes, sometimes incorporating elements from other Latin American traditions. Since the 1950s, descargas have enjoyed great popularity in the Latin music community, with many musicians and ensembles attaining international fame due to their descarga performances. This list compiles musicians which are widely considered to have become notable, at least in part, due to their descargas.

List

Notes

References

 *
Lists of musicians by genre